Spurt may refer to:
 Secretory protein in upper respiratory tracts, a gene encoding a secretory protein
 Spurt (Dutch Railways), a trade name for certain Dutch Rail routes

See also
 
 
 Blood spurt
 Growth spurt, the increase in bone growth during puberty
 Strength spurt, the increase of muscle mass and physical strength during puberty
 Spert (disambiguation)
 Spirthill